Amelia Elizabeth Simison McColgin (January 7, 1875 – July 9, 1972) was an American businesswoman and politician. A native of Kansas, she moved to western Oklahoma Territory in 1901. In 1920, she was the first woman elected to the Oklahoma House of Representatives.

Early life and family
Amelia Elizabeth Simison was born in Minneapolis, Kansas, on January 7, 1875, to Edward Harding Simison and his wife, Jane Eliza Moody. Both her parents died when she was three years old, and she was raised by relatives in Earlville, Illinois and educated at the Teachers Normal College and Illinois Wesleyan University. She married Grant McColgin (1870-1955) in 1895, and they moved to Oklahoma Territory in 1901. The Encyclopedia of Oklahoma History and Culture states that her husband bought a relinquishment in Roger Mills County, Oklahoma, in 1903. Bessie McColgin became a school teacher and the postmistress of the Ridgeton Post Office. A few years later, the family moved to Rankin, where she and her husband established the Rankin Telephone Company in their home. She also organized a Women's Christian Temperance Union chapter, and was a school teacher in Rankin's first public school. Her son Sterling S. McColgin also served in the Oklahoma Legislature.

Career
While pregnant with her 10th child, McColgin became the first woman elected to the Oklahoma House of Representatives. She served in the legislature in 1921 and 1922. According to legend, men in her family entered her name in the election as a Republican without her knowledge. She was seen as a "superior orator."

While in office, McColgin was heavily involved in health and safety legislation, and introduced a bill to create a Bureau of Child Hygiene. She attempted to pass legislation from Senator Lamar Looney, but few bills succeeded. She was also involved in a soldiers' relief program and helped establish a Tuberculosis Sanatorium in Oklahoma. Although she was not re-elected for a second term, three new woman members of the Oklahoma House of Representatives were elected in 1923. On the last day of her term, McColgin was presented with a wristwatch from her male colleagues to commemorate her service, which they jokingly stated was because "women legislators need to be watched". Nearly 40 years after her term ended, McColgin's son Sterling was elected to the same seat she had filled.

McColgin died at the age of 97 in Sayre, Oklahoma, on July 9, 1972. She was posthumously inducted into the Oklahoma Women's Hall of Fame in 2005.

Notes

References

External links

1875 births
1972 deaths
Republican Party members of the Oklahoma House of Representatives
Women state legislators in Oklahoma
20th-century American women politicians
20th-century American politicians
Illinois Wesleyan University alumni
People from Earlville, Illinois
People from Minneapolis, Kansas
People from Roger Mills County, Oklahoma
Schoolteachers from Oklahoma
Oklahoma postmasters
20th-century American women educators
20th-century American educators